Frank Vincent Fossella (November 6, 1925 – August 18, 2014) was an American politician and land developer. He was of Italian descent.

Life and career 
Frank Fossella represented parts of Staten Island as a member of the New York City Council in 1985. Mr. Fossella was a member of the Democratic Party, and was uncle to former Republican member of the United States House of Representatives Vito Fossella.

References

1925 births
2014 deaths
American real estate businesspeople
American people of Italian descent
New York City Council members
New York (state) Democrats
People from Staten Island